Glace Bay High School is a high school in Glace Bay, Nova Scotia, Canada. The school was built in 1989 and is located on Reserve Street.

Origins
Glace Bay High School was formed by combining the students of the former Morrison Glace Bay High School and Saint Michael's High School both of which became Junior High schools. Then in 1994 Donkin-Morien and Reserve District High Schools were closed and their students absorbed into the GBHS population causing the student population to rise to almost 1300. Morrison Junior High School and Saint Michael's Junior High School both closed in 2010 with the construction of Ocean View Education Centre. Ocean View Education Centre is now the only school in Glace Bay that is exclusively junior high.

References

External links
 Glace Bay High School official website
 Glace Bay High School history

High schools in Nova Scotia
Schools in the Cape Breton Regional Municipality